Reginaldo de França Lopes (born 31 October 1969), known as Reginaldo França, is a Brazilian professional football manager and former player.

A defensive midfielder, França played his entire career for teams in the Ceará state, aside from a short period at Cascavel in 2004, and notably represented Ferroviário in the 2002 Série C. He retired in 2006 with São Benedito, and subsequently became their manager in the following year. As a manager, he also remained in his native state, notably managing Maranguape for nearly four consecutive years.

Honours

Player
Guarany de Sobral
Campeonato Cearense Segunda Divisão: 2005

São Benedito
Campeonato Cearense Terceira Divisão: 2005

References

External links

1969 births
Living people
Sportspeople from Fortaleza
Brazilian footballers
Association football midfielders
Campeonato Brasileiro Série C players
FC Atlético Cearense players
Ferroviário Atlético Clube (CE) players
Guarany Sporting Club players
Brazilian football managers
Campeonato Brasileiro Série D managers
FC Atlético Cearense managers